Abdellah Kharbouchi  (born August 10, 1980, Beni-Sidel, Morocco) is a Moroccan footballer. He is currently player and manager of Villemomble Sports.

Coaching career
In the summer 2019, Kharbouchi returned to Villemomble Sports as a player and joint-manager alongside Jean-Claude Tagba.

References

External links

1980 births
Living people
Moroccan footballers
Moroccan football managers
Amiens SC players
Racing Club de France Football players
FC Sète 34 players
Le Havre AC players
FC Gueugnon players
AS Cannes players
USL Dunkerque players
Villemomble Sports players
AC Amiens players
Ligue 2 players
Championnat National players
Association football midfielders
People from Nador